1359 Prieska, provisional designation , is a rare-type carbonaceous asteroid from the outer region of the asteroid belt, approximately 50 kilometers in diameter. It was discovered on 22 July 1935, by English-born South-African astronomer Cyril Jackson at Johannesburg Observatory in South Africa. The asteroid was named after the South African town of Prieska.

Orbit and classification 

Prieska orbits the Sun in the outer main-belt at a distance of 2.9–3.3 AU once every 5 years and 6 months (2,011 days). Its orbit has an eccentricity of 0.07 and an inclination of 11° with respect to the ecliptic.

Physical characteristics 

According to the surveys carried out by NASA's Wide-field Infrared Survey Explorer with its subsequent NEOWISE mission and the Japanese Akari satellite, Prieska measures between 36.45 and 65.86 kilometers in diameter, and its surface has an albedo between 0.03 and 0.07. The Collaborative Asteroid Lightcurve Link derives an albedo of 0.0494 and a diameter of 52.07 kilometers with an absolute magnitude of 10.3.

Spectral type 

In the Tholen taxonomy, Prieska is a rare CX:-subtype, that transitions from the dark C to the X-type asteroids. Only a few asteroids have been assigned this spectral type by Tholen (also see list of CX-type asteroids).

Lightcurves 

Photometric lightcurve observations of Prieska at the Australian Oakley Southern Sky Observatory in May 2011 and October 2013, respectively, were inconclusive due to insufficient data. As of 2017, the asteroid's rotation period still remains unknown.

Naming 

This minor planet was named for the South African town of Prieska, located on the south bank of the Orange River, in the province of the Northern Cape. The official naming citation was mentioned in The Names of the Minor Planets by Paul Herget in 1955.

References

External links 
 Asteroid Lightcurve Database (LCDB), query form (info )
 Dictionary of Minor Planet Names, Google books
 Asteroids and comets rotation curves, CdR – Observatoire de Genève, Raoul Behrend
 Discovery Circumstances: Numbered Minor Planets (1)-(5000) – Minor Planet Center
 
 

001359
Discoveries by Cyril Jackson (astronomer)
Named minor planets
001359
19350722